Sky Cabin is a slowly revolving viewing cabin offering a panoramic view of Knott's Berry Farm and the surrounding land outside the park. On a clear day, Downtown Los Angeles can be viewed directly from the tower. The skyline of Disneyland and Disney's California Adventure can also be viewed. Before the announcement of the park's former Windseeker ride, Sky Cabin was a possible location to become replaced by Windseeker. Windseeker later opened in Fiesta Village and was later relocated to Worlds of Fun. It is one of the many existing attractions at the park operating before Cedar Fair took ownership of the park. It opened to the general public in 1976 as part of the former roaring 20's expansion area.

History
Sky Cabin opened in 1976 as part of the former Roaring 20s area. Originally, the ride was once the tallest structure in all of Orange County. The ride formerly shared its space with another previous ride: Sky Jump. Sky Tower riders were previously able to ascend up in the slow viewing cabin while also witnessing parachutes ascending and dropping 150 feet in the air. Sky Jump was later removed from the park during the early 2000s. On December 30, 2016, Sky Cabin was involved in an incident. Sky Cabin became stuck mid way causing riders to become stranded in the air for 8 hours. After being closed for over a year and undergoing months of a detailed inspection, review and minor operating adjustments to the ride, Sky Cabin reopened Feb 10, 2018. The ride received a new ride control system along with a hidden emergency toilet, new speakers, new air conditioning and window covers. The tower is topped by a giant lit "K" sign, in the style of Knott's Berry Farm's logotype. The original 1970s-era neon sign was replaced with an identical LED sign in June 2020, during the park's extended closure due to the ongoing COVID-19 pandemic.

Photo gallery

References 

Knott's Berry Farm
Cedar Fair attractions